Benrubi is a Jewish surname. Notable people with the surname include:

Abraham Benrubi (born 1969), American character actor
Isaak Benrubi (1876–1943), Jewish philosopher from Thessaloniki

Jewish surnames